Joachim ("Aki") Rademacher (20 June 1906 – 21 October 1970) was a German water polo player who competed in the 1928 Summer Olympics and in the 1932 Summer Olympics. He was born in Magdeburg.

In 1928 he was part of the German team which won the gold medal. He played all three matches and scored two goals. Four years later he won the silver medal with the German team. He played all four matches. His older brother Erich was his teammate in both tournaments.

He also competed in swimming, winning the bronze medal in the men's 1500 m freestyle at the first European Championships in 1926, and the gold in the men's 4×200 m freestyle relay event.

See also
 Germany men's Olympic water polo team records and statistics
 List of Olympic champions in men's water polo
 List of Olympic medalists in water polo (men)

External links
 

1906 births
1970 deaths
Sportspeople from Magdeburg
German male water polo players
Water polo players at the 1928 Summer Olympics
Water polo players at the 1932 Summer Olympics
Olympic water polo players of Germany
Olympic gold medalists for Germany
Olympic silver medalists for Germany
World record setters in swimming
Olympic medalists in water polo
European Aquatics Championships medalists in swimming
Medalists at the 1932 Summer Olympics
Medalists at the 1928 Summer Olympics